John Van Dyke or John van Dyke may refer to:

John Van Dyke (politician) (1807–1878), American politician
John Charles Van Dyke (1856–1932), American art historian and critic
John Wesley Van Dyke (1849–1939), president of the Atlantic Refining Company, Philadelphia
John van Dyke (canoeist) (born 1935), American canoeist